"Falling" is a song by English singer Harry Styles. This ballad was released through Erskine and Columbia Records on 7 March 2020 as the third single from his second studio album, Fine Line (2019). The song was written by Styles and Kid Harpoon, the latter of whom also handled the song's production.

Background and release

Styles and songwriter/producer Kid Harpoon first worked together on Styles' self-titled debut album (2017) on two songs: "Carolina" and "Sweet Creature". He would also become later the music director of Styles' first world solo tour. While working on his second album, Styles was seeing in the studio working on new music with Harpoon on 15 May 2019. While talking about Styles and the recording process of the album, Harpoon claimed: "He's got this wise-beyond-his-years timelessness about him. That's why he went on a whole emotional exploration with these songs. He went through this breakup that had a big impact on him." Harpoon then suggested Styles to write about his feelings towards it, saying:" He had a whole emotional journey about her, this whole relationship. But I kept saying, 'The best way of dealing with it is to put it in these songs you're writing.'" Regarding "Falling" in particular, he told: " Harry lives round the corner from me in LA and one day he wanted a lift somewhere, so I popped up there and he was getting out of the shower. I started playing piano while I was waiting for him, he was singing and in an hour we had written 'Falling'." The song was eventually released as the album's third single on 7 March 2020 to UK adult contemporary stations.

Composition
Written by Styles and its producer Kid Harpoon, "Falling" is a "hushed" soul piano ballad, that runs for four minutes long. In an interview Styles commented that the song was lyrically about slipping back into old ways, becoming a person he didn't want to be again and trying to be a better person.  In an interview with Radio.com, Styles states that "Falling" is, "That feeling of kind of being overwhelmed, you know you can feel like you’re drowning sometimes… and the fact that it's coming from the piano, I guess it's like writing these songs are what helps but also they can hurt you sometimes."  According to Laura Snapes from The Guardian, "the line, 'no one to blame but the drink in my wandering hands', from Falling, has prompted tabloid headlines." In another line, he sings: "I'm well aware I write too many songs about you." In fact, the song was said to be written about his breakup with ex-girlfriend Camille Rowe. Hannah Mylrea from NME also noted that "he alludes to the fact he cheated on his ex, admitting that 'there's no one to blame but the drink and my wandering hands."

Critical reception
Most critics were positive with the song. Bryan Rolli from Consequence of Sound named it a "gorgeous piano ballad [...] a readymade mid-set tearjerker if there ever was one." Alexandra Pollard from The Independent called it a "moody, Moog-y lamentation." Writing for Slant Magazine, Anna Richmond praised its introspectiveness and noted that "the line 'What am I now? What if I'm someone I don't want around' is one of Fine Lines most moving moments." Jon Pareles of The New York Times described it as a "hymnlike, bitterly self-accusatory [song]." Susan Hansen of Clash praised it, saying that it "holds much appeal. It's a song where piano and Moog bass form a relaxed base for introspection and sincerity." Rolling Stone Rob Sheffield was less favourable, calling it a "forgettable ballad," although he praised Styles for the lyrical content, claiming: "If there's a nontoxic masculinity, Harry Styles just might've found it."

Awards and nominations

Chart performance
"Falling" debuted at number 39 on the UK Singles Chart and later peaked at number 15, making it the fourth song from Fine Line to chart in the UK top 20. In November 2020, it received a platinum certification from the British Phonographic Industry (BPI) for selling 600,000 units in the UK, to be followed by double platinum in 2022. In the US, "Falling" was certified platinum by the Recording Industry Association of America (RIAA) for sales of 1 million track-equivalent units.

Music video
The music video, directed by Dave Meyers, was released on 28 February 2020. The production design by François Audouy was awarded an Art Directors Guild Excellence in Production Design award, which was the first time the ADG had recognized a music video with a trophy in its 20-year history.

Synopsis
The video opens up with Styles in an apartment, drenched and gasping for air. The video flashes in Styles’ first verse, and begins to feature him alone in the apartment with a piano. As he sings the ballad, the room slowly fills with water, until, in the end, he is fully submerged, drowning.

Live performances
On 18 February 2020, Styles performed the song for the first time at the 2020 Brit Awards.

Cover versions
British girl group Little Mix performed the song acoustically as part of Radio 1's Live Lounge.
British singer Gabrielle included a cover of the "Falling" on her 2021 album Do It Again following a live performance of the song during an episode of The Masked Singer upon which she was a contestant as Harlequin.
Taylor Dayne performed this song on  The Masked Singer as "Popcorn".
BTS member Jungkook released a cover of the song on YouTube.
TWICE member Nayeon released a cover of the song on YouTube.
Kelly Clarkson covered this song on her talk show Kellyoke segment aired on May 5, 2022.

Credits and personnel
Credits adapted from the liner notes of Fine Line.

Recording
 Recorded at RAK Studios (London) and Harpoon House (Los Angeles, California)
 Mixed at EastWest Studios (Los Angeles, California)
 Mastered at Sterling Sound (Edgewater, New Jersey)

Personnel

 Harry Styles – vocals, backing vocals, songwriting
 Kid Harpoon – production, songwriting, piano, moog bass, organ
 Tyler Johnson – additional production
 Leo Abrahams – electric guitar
 Sammy Witte – engineering
 Dan Ewins – assistant engineering
 Spike Stent – mixing
 Michael Freeman – mix assistant
 Randy Merrill – mastering

Charts

Weekly charts

Year-end charts

Certifications

Release history

References

2010s ballads
2020 singles
2019 songs
British soul songs
Columbia Records singles
Harry Styles songs
Music videos directed by Dave Meyers (director)
Songs written by Harry Styles
Songs written by Kid Harpoon
Soul ballads